Madisonville Consolidated Independent School District is a public school district based in Madisonville, Texas (USA).

In addition to Madisonville, the district serves the cities of Midway and Bedias as well as rural areas in eastern Madison and northeastern Grimes counties.

In 2009, the school district was rated "academically acceptable" by the Texas Education Agency.

Schools
Madisonville Senior High (Grades 9-12)
Madisonville Junior High (Grades 6-8)
Madisonville Intermediate (Grades 3-5)
Madisonville Elementary (Grades PK-2)
Madisonville High School located in Madisonville, Texas, is a 4A school.

References

External links

Madisonville Consolidated ISD

School districts in Madison County, Texas
School districts in Grimes County, Texas